Andriivka is a village in the Poltava Raion, Poltava Oblast, Ukraine. It belongs to Mykhailivka rural hromada, one of the hromads of Ukraine.

Andriivka was previously located in Mashivka Raion until it was abolished and its territory was merged into Poltava Raion on 18 July 2020 as part of the administrative reform of Ukraine, which reduced the number of raions of Poltava Oblast to four.

References

External links
 Andriivka at the Verkhovna Rada of Ukraine site

Villages in Poltava Raion